Land of the Loops is the stage name of Alan Sutherland, a musician from Boston, Massachusetts, United States. He began recording in the early 1990s and continues to record today. His music is electronic,  makes heavy use of samples and loops, and has an indie rock influence.

Education
Sutherland studied art at the University of Colorado in Boulder. In 1987, he entered a master's degree program in art education at the Pratt Institute in New York.

Recordings
Sutherland's passion was low-fidelity home cassette recording. He and Steven Nereo founded the Slabco label, which would later release the first recordings of their band, Land of the Loops. Sutherland recorded several loops and sample-driven cassette releases for Slabco from his apartment.

Employees at Seattle's Up Records heard his second Land of the Loops cassette release, "Percival," leading to a recording deal. Produced by Tucker Martine, many of the songs on "Percival" were reworked for the first Up Records CD release, "Bundle of Joy" in 1996. Among the guest musicians on the album, two songs have vocals by Beat Happening's Heather Lewis. The CD had some success on college radio with the standout track and advance single, "Multi-family Garage Sale," being licensed by Miller Genuine Draft for a beer commercial.

After two extended play record (EPs), "Refried Treats" (1997) and "Hurry Up and Wait" (1999), Land of the Loops released its second full-length album "Puttering About a Small Land" in 2000. The music for this album was mostly recorded at his mother's Lincoln, Massachusetts home, where he lived while finishing up his master's degree thesis on dyslexia and art, two personally relevant subjects. Besides the vocals of Heather Lewis, "Puttering About a Small Land" also features the Japanese singer Takako Minekawa. Without an obvious single, this release was not as commercially successful as "Bundle of Joy."

In an attempt to release music on every format, Up Records agreed to have a flexi-single printed for the single "Single Girl Summer Home" in 2001. One thousand singles were pressed and inserted in an issue of a "Jerome" 'zine created for the occasion by Denver artist Jeremy Havens. Not being a widely popular format, the number of singles sold was negligible, with the bulk of flexi-disks sitting in storage at Up Records.

With changes at Up Records due to the death of founder Chris Takino, Land of the Loops was no longer tied to that label. In a one-shot release on Bologna, Italy's unhip records, Land of the Loops put out one side of a 2-sided EP with Buckminster Fuzeboard in 2003. The Land of the Loops side contains the song "Sippy Cup," a guest remix by the band Tipsy called "Tippy Cup," and an infinite loop of bubble noises. This release is also the only Land of the Loops release that does not feature cartoon-like cover art drawn by Sutherland.

Commercial uses
With its first release on Up Records, the 7" single "Multi-family Garage Sale," Land of the Loops has been successful in licensing its music for commercial uses, with that song being used on a Miller Genuine Draft TV spot. Other music from the album containing the single, "Bundle of Joy," was used on projects from a TV commercial aired in Japan directed by Sofia Coppola to the first song, "Welcome (Back)" played on the eighth episode of HBO's The Sopranos. The song "Heidi Cakes" is played during the credits of Sofia Coppola's short Lick the Star. The album Bundle of Joy as a whole was used as the soundtrack for the movie Lover Girl starring Sandra Bernhard in 1997.

The album Bundle of Joy was featured in the 2000 movie High Fidelity.

List of recordings

 "Straight Out of Milner" Slabco 12
 "True Circles in Jig Time" with Explosion Robinson, Slabco 18
 "Percival" Slabco 23
 "Casiocore" (1994) with Steven and Explosion Robinson, Slabco 26
 "Multi-family Garage Sale/Rotate" (1995) UP011
 "Bundle of Joy" (1996) Up Records UP020
 "Refried Treats" (1997) Up Records UP031
 "Hurry Up and Wait" (1999) Up Records UP074
 "Puttering About a Small Land" (2000) Up Records UP080
 "Single Girl Summer Home (Duplex Mix)/Party Pooper (Pooper Scooper Mix by Buckminster Fuzeboard)" flexi-single (2000) UP092
 "Sippy Cup (featuring Tipsy)" (2003) with Buckminster Fuzeboard, unhip records

Current work
Having switched from recording on a sampler to making music using a PC loaded with Cakewalk Sonar, Land of the Loops is still recording music. Besides finishing a song for the  "Casiocore 2004" compilation, Sutherland has several more finished songs sketched out for a future Land of the Loops release.

Sutherland has also been working on soundscores for his wife Lorraine Chapman's Boston-based dance company LCTC which performed "Hand Over the Head" to Sutherland's Japanese-inspired musical score as well as the soundscore for the show "The Floating World" in 2007.

References

External links
Land of the Loops on Myspace

American electronic musicians
Musicians from Boston
Living people
Year of birth missing (living people)